Lewis Solon Rosenstiel (July 21, 1891 – January 21, 1976) was the founder of Schenley Industries, an American liquor company, and a philanthropist. The Lewis S. Rosenstiel Award is named after him and the Rosenstiel School of Marine and Atmospheric Science at the University of Miami is named after him and his wife.

Early life and career
Rosenstiel was born to a Jewish family in Cincinnati, Ohio, the son of Elizabeth (née Johnson) and Solon Rosenstiel. He attended University School and Franklin Prep.  He then went to work at his uncle's business, Susquemac Distilling Company in Milton, Kentucky. Rosenstiel organized Schenley Products Company in the 1920s.  The company bought numerous distillers, including one in Schenley, Pennsylvania, that had licenses to produce medicinal whisky. In 1933, when Prohibition ended, Schenley Distillers Company was formed as a publicly owned company. (The name was changed to Schenley Industries in 1949.) Schenley became one of the largest liquor companies in the United States. It was one of the "Big Four", which dominated liquor sales, and included Seagram, National Distillers, and Hiram Walker. Rosenstiel retired from Schenley in 1968 and it was acquired by Israeli financier Meshulam Riklis. The company was sold to Guinness in 1987. In February 1971, a Congressional investigator testified Lewis Rosenstiel participated in a bootlegging "consortium".

Relationship with Roy Cohn and J Edgar Hoover 
Rosenstiel was a friend of attorney Roy Cohn, and together they formed the organization American Jewish League Against Communism. Cohn was eventually disbarred based on his attempt to fraudulently name himself co-executor of Rosenstiel's will by forcing a dying, semicomatose Rosenstiel to sign a codicil that Cohn falsely claimed was related to Rosenstiel's divorce. The incident happened in 1975, and Cohn was disbarred shortly before his death in 1986.

Rosenstiel was also friends with Federal Bureau of Investigation director J. Edgar Hoover, and was the primary contributor to the J. Edgar Hoover Foundation.

Personal life
Rosenstiel was married five times: to Dorothy Heller, Leonore Cohn (niece of Harry Cohn, founder of Columbia Pictures), Louise Rosenstiel, Susan Kaufman and Blanka Wdowiak. His daughter, Louise, married Sidney Frank, who well after her death in 1973, became a billionaire creating the vodka Grey Goose and through guerilla marketing of the German cordial, Jägermeister. His second wife. Lee, married Walter Annenberg, was on the board of the Metropolitan Opera, and led the influential Annenberg Foundation. His divorce from his fourth wife changed the divorce laws in the U.S. His fifth wife, Blanka A. Rosenstiel, took over the Rosenstiel Foundation following his death in 1976.

His first wife, Dorothy Heller, contributed the funds which Rosenstiel used to start Schenley Industries. Rosenstiel's mother's family were Disraelis; when they bought the Johnson trading post in Ohio, they changed their name to Johnson.

Rosenstiel died in early 1976, in Miami Beach.

Conyers Farm
Rosenstiel had purchased in 1936 the 1,481 acre estate of Edmund C. Converse, the first president of Banker's Trust. Conyers Farm was one of "the great estates of America" and located in Greenwich CT Farm</ref> It was larger than Central Park and Prospect park combined. The main house had 52 rooms. It was bought by the paper magnate Peter Brant in 1980 and developed into 95 10-acre sites, sold to celebrities such as Vince McMahon and Ron Howard.

References

1891 births
1976 deaths
Alcohol in the United States
American drink industry businesspeople
Drink distillers
Businesspeople from Cincinnati
Jewish American philanthropists
20th-century American businesspeople
20th-century American philanthropists
20th-century American Jews